is a railway station on the Keiō Line and Tōkyū Setagaya Line in Setagaya, Tokyo, Japan, operated by the private railway operators Keio Corporation and Tokyu Corporation.

Lines

Station layout

Keio platforms

Tokyu platforms
The Tokyu station has two tracks serving two bay platforms.

History
The Keio Line station opened on 15 April 1913. The Tokyu station opened on 1 May 1925.

References

External links

 Shimo-takaido Station information (Keio) 

Railway stations in Japan opened in 1913
Keio Line
Stations of Keio Corporation
Tokyu Setagaya Line
Stations of Tokyu Corporation
Railway stations in Tokyo